Vera Nemirova (born 1972) is a Bulgarian-German opera director who has worked at major opera houses in Europe, staging for example Wagner's Der Ring des Nibelungen at the Oper Frankfurt. She directed for the Munich Biennale and the Salzburg Festival.

Career 
Born in Sofia, Nemirova has lived in Germany from 1982. She studied directing music theatre (Musiktheaterregie) at the Hochschule für Musik Hanns Eisler in Berlin, taking master classes with Ruth Berghaus and Peter Konwitschny.

Nemirova staged Puccini's La fanciulla del West at the Deutsche Oper Berlin in 2004, conducted by Christian Thielemann. She directed at the Vienna State Opera Tchaikovsky's The Queen of Spades in 2007 and Verdi's Macbeth in 2009. She staged Alban Berg's Lulu at the Salzburg Festival in 2010. From 2010 to 2012 season, she staged Wagner's Der Ring des Nibelungen at the Oper Frankfurt. She directed in 2015 Peter Ruzicka's Hölderlin and Meyerbeer's Vasco da Gama, the original version of L'Africaine at the Deutsche Oper Berlin, and in 2016 Wagner's Die Meistersinger von Nürnberg at the Theater Erfurt.

She staged Weber's Euryanthe and Verdi's Otello at the Semperoper in Dresden, Hèctor Parra's Das geopferte Leben for the Munich Biennale, Mozart's Ideomeneo. Verdi's La Traviata, and Puccini's La Bohème at the Staatstheater Mainz, again Verdi's Macbeth, Gounod's Faust and Wagner's Tristan und Isolde at the Bonn Opera, Puccini's Tosca and Ruzicka's Celan at the Theater Bremen, and Mozart's Le nozze di Figaro at the Latvian National Opera in Riga.

Awards 
The Academy of the Arts in Berlin awarded the Berliner Kunstpreis (Berlin Art Prize) of 2006 to Nemirova.

Publications 

References

External links 
 Vera Nemirova Der Opernfreund
 Vera Nemirova (in Bulgarian) theatre.art.bg

Opera directors
Female opera directors
1972 births
Living people
Entertainers from Sofia
Hochschule für Musik Hanns Eisler Berlin alumni